Shorea megistophylla is a species of plant in the family Dipterocarpaceae. It is endemic to Sri Lanka.

References

megistophylla
Endemic flora of Sri Lanka
Trees of Sri Lanka
Critically endangered flora of Asia
Taxonomy articles created by Polbot